Richard Masters is the current Chief Executive of the Premier League, the highest tier of association football in England.

Biography
In his personal life, Richard Masters has two young sons.

Masters' education consisted of attending the independent Solihull School, which led to him identifying as an Aston Villa supporter. He later studied for a BSc Economics and Geography at University College London.

Earlier in his career, he was the Marketing Manager for England and Wales Cricket Board from 1994 to 2000, before serving as Commercial Director for the English Football League from 2001 to 2006. He moved to the Premier League in 2006 where he became the Director of Sales and Marketing, holding the position from January 2006 until November 2018.

Premier League
Richard Masters was appointed as the Chief Executive of the Premier League in November 2019, following a year-long interim period in the position after the previous incumbent Richard Scudamore's resignation in December 2018. Masters' role of Chief Executive was created after Richard Scudamore's Executive Chairman role was split into the two roles of Chief Executive and Chairman following Scudamore's resignation. Whilst Gary Hoffman was appointed as the new chairman on 24 April 2020, Masters retains authority as holding the highest position at the Premier League, with his other responsibilities including leading negotiations on new media rights contracts, resolving club disputes and ownership issues, and overseeing operations.

Masters was the Premier League's fourth choice for the role, following a protracted recruitment process that involved Susanna Dinnage, Tim Davie and David Pemsel all being offered, but later declining the position. There were accusations that the biggest teams in the Premier League held too much influence over the process, with Liverpool and Manchester United alleged to have held private talks with candidates chosen by the Premier League's official nominating committee, before deciding whether or not to enact their unofficial veto over the decision.

Newcastle United Takeover

On 9 September 2020, Richard Masters was accused by Newcastle United of not "acting appropriately" in relation to the Premier League's blocking of the attempted takeover of the club by a consortium consisting of PCP Capital Partners, Reuben Brothers and the Public Investment Fund of Saudi Arabia. This was following accusations from the consortium that the Premier League had deliberately misapplied their Owners' and Directors' test in order to frustrate the deal, due to improper influence from various third parties to block it. On the 29th September 2021, a Competition Appeal Tribunal heard that Masters and the Premier League "Abused its position" after it was "improperly influenced" by outside agencies such as the Qatari owned media outlet, BeIN Sports.

Coronavirus crisis
On 9 September 2020, Masters told the BBC that it was "absolutely critical" for fans to be allowed back into stadiums to watch Premier League matches as soon as possible, as Premier League clubs stood to suffer £700m in lost revenue if the 2020-2021 season (running from 12 September 2020 to 23 May 2021) was played behind closed doors. However, on 22 September 2020, Prime Minister Boris Johnson announced that spectators would continue to be banned from attending all sporting events in England until the end of March 2021, at the earliest.

References

Living people
British chief executives
Association football executives
Year of birth missing (living people)